John C. Calhoun State Office Building is a historic office building located at Columbia, South Carolina. It was built in 1926, and is a five-story, I-shaped limestone clad building over a raised basement in the Italian Renaissance Revival style.  It housed the South Carolina State Highway Department until 1952. The National Guard seized and occupied the Calhoun Building from October to December 1935 under the orders of Governor Olin D. Johnston.

It was added to the National Register of Historic Places in 2011.

References

Office buildings on the National Register of Historic Places in South Carolina
Renaissance Revival architecture in South Carolina
Office buildings completed in 1926
Buildings and structures in Columbia, South Carolina
National Register of Historic Places in Columbia, South Carolina